"Feelin' Fine" is a song written by Darren Mew and originally released as a happy hardcore song in 1998 under the alias Unique. In 2003, Ultrabeat released a cover of the song with newly added lyrics as their second single; it reached number 12 on the UK Singles Chart.

Unique version
Darren Styles released this song under the alias Unique in 1998. It was a happy hardcore song and it was first released as a 12" record on UK Dance with the b-side, "Distant Skies". A Force & Styles remix was later released as the b-side to "Higher Ground". It is one of the earliest songs where Darren is the singer, and it also appeared on some hardcore compilation albums.

Track listing
12-inch single
 "Feelin' Fine" – 6:49
 "Distant Skies" – 7:22

Personnel
 Unique – vocals, producer
 Melissa – vocals (on "Distant Skies")

Ultrabeat version

"Feelin' Fine" was the second single released by British electronic music group Ultrabeat. It peaked at number 12 on the UK Singles Chart. The track was available on CD and 12-inch vinyl formats. Remixes for the song were provided by CJ Stone, KB Project, Flip & Fill, and by the writer and vocalist of the song, Darren Styles.

Track listings
CD single 1
 "Feelin' Fine" (radio edit) – 3:01
 "Feelin' Fine" (CJ Stone remix) – 7:41
 "Feelin' Fine" (extended mix) – 7:29
 "Feelin' Fine" (KB Project remix) – 5:54
 "Feelin' Fine" (Darren Styles remix) – 7:07
 "Feelin' Fine" (Flip & Fill remix) – 6:55

CD single 2
 "Feelin' Fine"
 "Pretty Green Eyes"

12-inch single
 "Feelin' Fine" (extended mix) – 7:29
 "Feelin' Fine" (CJ Stone remix) – 7:41
 "Feelin' Fine" (Darren Styles remix) – 7:07

Download EP
 "Feelin' Fine" (radio edit) – 3:01
 "Feelin' Fine" (CJ Stone radio edit) – 2:26
 "Feelin' Fine" (Scott Brown remix) – 5:56
 "Feelin' Fine" (Darren Styles remix) – 7:07
 "Feelin' Fine" (KB Project remix) – 5:54
 "Feelin' Fine" (extended mix) – 7:29
 "Feelin' Fine" (CJ Stone remix) – 7:41
 "Feelin' Fine" (Flip & Fill remix) – 6:55

Personnel
Ultrabeat
 Mike Di Scala – vocals, producer
 Ian Redman – producer
 Chris Henry – producer

Other personnel
 Ignition – design

Charts

Weekly charts

Year-end charts

References

External links
 Unique – "Feelin' Fine" on Discogs
 Ultrabeat – 
 Ultrabeat – 

1998 singles
2003 singles
Darren Styles songs
Songs written by Darren Styles
Ultrabeat songs